Allen Joseph Ellender (September 24, 1890 – July 27, 1972) was an American politician and lawyer who was a U.S. Senator from Louisiana from 1937 until his death. He was a Democrat who was originally allied with Huey Long. As Senator he compiled a generally conservative record, voting 77% of the time with the Conservative Coalition on domestic issues. A staunch segregationist, he signed the Southern Manifesto in 1956, voted against the Voting Rights Act of 1965, and opposed anti-lynching legislation in 1938. Unlike many Democrats he was not a "hawk" in foreign policy and opposed the Vietnam War.

Ellender served as President Pro Tempore, and the chair of the Senate Appropriations Committee. He also served as the chair of the Senate Agriculture Committee for over 16 years.

Early life
Ellender was born in the town of Montegut in Terrebonne Parish, a center of Cajun culture. He was the son of Victoria Marie (Javeaux) and Wallace Richard Ellender, Sr. He attended public and private schools, and in 1909 he graduated with a Bachelor of Arts degree from the Roman Catholic St. Aloysius College in New Orleans. (It has been reorganized as Brother Martin High School). He graduated from Tulane University Law School in New Orleans with a LL.B. in 1913, was admitted to the bar later that year, and launched his practice in Houma.

Early career
Ellender was appointed as the city attorney of Houma, Louisiana, serving from 1913 to 1915, then served as Terrebonne Parish District Attorney from 1915 to 1916.

World War I
Though he received a draft deferment for World War I, Ellender volunteered for military service. Initially rejected on medical grounds after being diagnosed with a kidney stone, Ellender persisted in attempting to serve in uniform. After surgery and recovery, Ellender inquired through his Congressman about obtaining a commission in the Army's Judge Advocate General Corps, and was offered a commission as an interpreter and translator in the United States Marine Corps, which he declined over concerns that because he spoke Louisiana French, he might not be proficient enough in the formal French language.

While taking courses to improve his French, he also applied for a position in the Student Army Training Corps at Tulane University. He was accepted into the program in October 1918, and reported to Camp Martin on the Tulane University campus. The war ended in November, and the SATC program was disbanded, so Ellender was released from the service in December before completing his training.  Despite attempts lasting into the late 1920s to secure an honorable discharge as proof of his military service, Ellender was unsuccessful in obtaining one. Instead, the commander of Camp Martin replied to an inquiry from Ellender's congressman that "Private Allen J. Ellender" had been released from military service in compliance with an army order prohibiting new enlistments in the SATC after the Armistice of November 11, 1918. As his career progressed, his biography often included the incorrect claim that Ellender had served as a sergeant in the United States Army Artillery Corps during the war.

State politics
Ellender was a delegate to the Louisiana constitutional convention in 1921. The constitution produced by that body was retired in 1974, two years after Ellender's death. He served in the Louisiana House of Representatives from 1924 to 1936. He was floor leader from 1928 to 1932, when in 1929 he worked successfully against the impeachment forces, led by Ralph Norman Bauer and Cecil Morgan, that attempted to remove Governor Huey Long for a litany of abuses of power. Ellender was the House Speaker from 1932 to 1936, when he was elected to the US Senate.

U.S. Senator
In 1937 he took his Senate seat, formerly held by the fallen Huey Long and slated for the Democratic nominee Oscar Kelly Allen, Sr., of Winnfield, the seat of Long's home parish of Winn. Allen had won the Democratic nomination by a plurality exceeding 200,000 votes, but he died shortly thereafter. His passing enabled Ellender's election. The Democrats had so dominated state politics since the disfranchisement of most blacks at the turn of the century, that the primary was the decisive election for offices.

Ellender was one of twenty liberal Democratic senators in July 1937 who voted against killing the Judicial Procedures Reform Bill of 1937, which was introduced by President Franklin D. Roosevelt in an effort to pack the United States Supreme Court following several anti-New Deal decisions from the Court.

Lorris M. Wimberly of Arcadia in Bienville Parish, meanwhile, succeeded Ellender as House Speaker. Wimberly was the choice of Governor Richard Webster Leche and thereafter Lieutenant Governor Earl Kemp Long, who succeeded Leche to the governorship.

Ellender was repeatedly re-elected to the Senate and served until his death in 1972. He gained seniority and great influence. He was the leading sponsor of the federal free lunch program, which was enacted in 1945 and continues; it was a welfare program that helped poor students.

In 1946, Ellender defended fellow Southern demagogue Theodore Bilbo, who incited violence against blacks in his re-election campaign. When a petition was filed to the Senate, a committee chaired by Ellender investigated the voter suppression. Ellender defended the violent attacks on blacks trying to vote as the result of "tradition and custom" rather than Bilbo's incitements. The committee voted on party lines to clear Bilbo, with the three Democrats siding with the Mississippi demagogue while the two conservative Republicans, Bourke Hickenlooper of Iowa and Styles Bridges of New Hampshire, dissented from the verdict. Bilbo, however, ultimately did not take his Senate seat due to medical issues and died a short time later.

Ellender served as the powerful chairman of the Senate Agriculture Committee from 1951 to 1953 and 1955 to 1971, through which capacity he was a strong defender of sugar cane interests. He chaired the even more powerful Senate Appropriations Committee from 1971 until his death. Denoting his seniority as a Democrat in the Senate, Ellender was President pro tempore of the U.S. Senate from 1971 to 1972, an honorific position.

Ellender was an opponent of Republican Senator Joseph McCarthy of Wisconsin, who had achieved national prominence through a series of well-publicized speeches and investigations attacking supposed communist infiltration in the US government, army and educational institutions during the 1950s.

In March 1952, Ellender stated the possibility of the House of Representatives electing the president in that year's general election and added that the possibility could arise from the entry of Georgia Senator Richard Russell, Jr. into the general election as a third-party candidate and thereby see neither President Truman or Republican Senator Robert A. Taft able to secure enough votes from the Electoral College.

Ellender strongly opposed the federal civil rights legislation of the 1960s, which included the Voting Rights Act of 1965 to enforce blacks' constitutional rights in voting. Many, particularly in the Deep South, had been disfranchised since 1900. In the aftermath of the Duck Hill lynchings, he also helped block a proposed anti-lynching bill which had previously been passed in the House, proclaiming, "We shall at all cost preserve the white supremacy of America." He did support some Louisiana state legislation sought by civil rights groups, such as repeal of the state poll tax (a disfranchisement mechanism).

In late 1962 he underwent a tour of East Africa. In Southern Rhodesia he spoke to the media and was reported by a newspaper to have said he did not believe African territories were ready for self-governance and "incapable of leadership" without the assistance of white people. He was further reported to have said apartheid in South Africa was a proper policy choice and should have been instituted sooner. Ellender later denied making these remarks, but Uganda and Tanganyika responded to the allegations by barring him from entering their countries.

On August 31, 1964, during President Johnson's signing of the Food Stamp Act of 1964, the president noted Ellender as one of the members of Congress he wanted to compliment for playing "a role in the passage of this legislation".

Early in his tenure, the Audubon Society, with an interest in the ivory-billed woodpecker, which faced extinction, persuaded Ellender to work for the establishment of the proposed Tensas Swamp National Park to preserve bird habitat: 60,000 acres of land owned by the Singer Sewing Company in Madison Parish in northeastern Louisiana. Ellender's bill died in committee. In 1998, long after Ellender's death, Congress established the Tensas River National Wildlife Refuge.

Sticking with Truman, 1948
Ellender rarely had serious opposition for his Senate seat. In his initial election in 1936, Ellender defeated U.S. Representative John N. Sandlin of Louisiana's 4th congressional district in the Democratic primary, 364,931 (68 percent) to 167,471 (31.2 percent). Sandlin was from Minden in Webster Parish in northwest Louisiana. There was no Republican opposition to Ellender during much of his tenure.

Ellender was steadfastly loyal to all Democratic presidential nominees and refused to support then Governor Strom Thurmond of South Carolina for president in 1948. That year Thurmond, the States Rights Party nominee, was also listed on the ballot as the official Democratic nominee in Louisiana and three other southern states. Ellender supported Harry Truman, whose name was placed on the ballot only after Governor Earl Kemp Long called a special session of the legislature to place the president's name on the ballot. "As a Democratic nominee, I am pledged to support the candidate of my party, and that I will do," declared Ellender, though he could have argued that Thurmond, not Truman, was technically the "Democratic nominee" in Louisiana.

Senatorial campaigns of 1954, 1960, and 1966
In 1954, Ellender defeated fellow Democrat Frank Burton Ellis, a former state senator from St. Tammany Parish and later a short term judge of the United States District Court for the Eastern District of Louisiana. Ellender polled 268,054 votes (59.1 percent) in the party primary; Ellis, 162,775 (35.9 percent), with 4 percent for minor candidates. He faced no Republican opposition that year.

In 1960, Ellender was challenged by the former Republican National Committeeman George W. Reese, Jr., a New Orleans lawyer, who in 1952 and 1954 had challenged the conservative Democratic U.S. Representative Felix Edward Hébert of Louisiana's 1st congressional district, based about New Orleans. In the 1960 campaign, Reese accused Ellender of being "soft on communism". Ellender retorted that Reese's allegation came with "ill grace for the spokesman for the member of a party which has permitted the establishment of a Red-dominated beach head [Cuba] only ninety miles from our shores to attack my record against the spread of communism."

Reese campaigned across the state in the fall, accompanied at times by Richard Lowrie Hagy of New Orleans, the in-state campaign manager for both Reese and Vice President Richard M. Nixon. In Lake Charles, he claimed that Senator Ellender had been lax in protecting military installations in Louisiana from being downsized or dismantled, with the impacted military services sent to bases in other states. "There has been inadequate representation of the state in these matters," Reese said.

Ellender crushed Reese's hopes of making a respectable showing: he polled 432,228 (79.8 percent); Reese, 109,698 (20.2 percent). Reese's best performance was in two parishes that voted for Richard Nixon for president; La Salle Parish (Jena) and Ouachita Parish (Monroe), but he still gained less than a third of the ballots – 31.3 percent in each. In Caddo Parish (Shreveport), Reese finished with 30 percent. Reese was only the third Republican since the Seventeenth Amendment was ratified to seek a U.S. Senate seat from Louisiana. Ellender ran 24,889 votes ahead of the John F. Kennedy-Lyndon Johnson ticket, but 265,965 voters cast in the presidential race ignored the Senate contest, a phenomenon that would later be called an "undervote".

In 1966, Ellender disposed of two weak primary opponents, including the liberal State Senator J. D. DeBlieux (pronounced "W") of Baton Rouge and the conservative businessman Troyce Guice, a native of St. Joseph in  Tensas Parish, who then resided in Ferriday, and later in  Natchez, Mississippi. The Republicans once again did not field a candidate against Ellender that year.

Ellender cultivated good relationships with the media, whose coverage of his tenure helped him to fend off serious competition. One of his newspaper favorites was Adras LaBorde, longtime managing editor of Alexandria Daily Town Talk. The two "Cajuns" shared fish stories on many occasions.

Last campaign, death, and aftermath

In 1972, the Democratic gubernatorial runner-up from December 1971, former state senator J. Bennett Johnston, Jr., of Shreveport, challenged Ellender for renomination. Ellender was expected to defeat Johnston, but he died from a heart attack on July 27, aged 81, at Bethesda Naval Hospital. Nearly 10 percent of Democratic voters, however, still voted for the deceased Ellender.

Johnston became the Democratic nominee in a manner somewhat reminiscent of how Ellender had won the Senate seat in 1936 after the death of Governor Oscar K. Allen. Johnston easily defeated the Republican candidate, Ben C. Toledano, a prominent attorney from New Orleans who later became a conservative columnist, and former Governor John McKeithen, a Democrat running as an Independent in the general election because he had not been able to qualify for the primary ballot, given the timing of Ellender's death.

The Ellender family endorsed McKeithen in the 1972 general election because of resentment over Johnston's entry into the race against Ellender.
Ellender's immediate successor was not Johnston but Elaine S. Edwards, first wife of Governor Edwin Edwards, who was appointed to fill his seat from August 1, 1972, to November 13, 1972. Six days after the election, Johnston was appointed to finish Ellender's remaining term to gain a seniority advantage over other freshman senators.

Legacy
In the Senate, Ellender was known by his colleagues for Cajun cooking, including dishes ranging from roast duck to shrimp jambalaya. As of 2009, the Senate dining room still served "Ellender Gumbo."

Ellender Memorial High School in Houma and Allen Ellender School in Marrero are named in his honor.

In 1994, Ellender was inducted posthumously into the Louisiana Political Museum and Hall of Fame in Winnfield.

The Allen J. Ellender Memorial Library on the campus of Nicholls State University in Thibodaux is named after him.

See also 

 List of United States Congress members who died in office (1950–99)

References

Further reading
 Becnel, Thomas. Senator Allen Ellender of Louisiana: a biography (1996), the standard scholarly biography online
 Finley, Keith M. Delaying the Dream: Southern Senators and the Fight Against Civil Rights, 1938-1965 (Baton Rouge, LSU Press, 2008).

External links
 https://web.archive.org/web/20090703054258/http://cityofwinnfield.com/museum.html

 https://web.archive.org/web/20070127233419/http://www.legis.state.la.us/members/h1812-2008.pdf

External links

1890 births
1972 deaths
20th-century American lawyers
20th-century American politicians
American segregationists
American white supremacists
Brother Martin High School alumni
Cajun people
Democratic Party United States senators from Louisiana
Huey Long
Lawyers from New Orleans
People from Houma, Louisiana
Politicians from New Orleans
Presidents pro tempore of the United States Senate
Speakers of the Louisiana House of Representatives
Democratic Party members of the Louisiana House of Representatives
Tulane University Law School alumni
Tulane University alumni